Armillaria cepistipes is a species of mushroom in the family Physalacriaceae. This is a weakly plant pathogenic species that is typically found growing at the base of deciduous trees that have previously been stressed by another pathogen. The mycelium of the fungus is bioluminescent.

See also
 List of Armillaria species

References

cepistipes
Bioluminescent fungi
Fungi of Europe
Fungi of North America
Fungal tree pathogens and diseases
Fungi described in 1920
Taxa named by Josef Velenovský